The St Luke's Garrison Chapel is a defunct Anglican church which formed part of the Tigné Barracks and Cambridge Battery used by the British army till 1979. The building now contains offices of no religious purpose.

History
The foundation stone for St Luke's was laid on 16 January 1910 by the Governor of Malta, Sir Leslie Rundle. The church was built to serve the British army stationed in the Tigne Barracks thus only accessible to military personnel. The chapel was finished some months later and opened for its first service on Advent Sunday, 27 November 1910. It was dedicated by William Collins, Bishop of Gibraltar.

During WWII the chapel was badly damaged and so declared unsafe, with the congregation having to attend services at the nearby church of the Holy Trinity. The chapel continued to be used until 1979 when the British forces left Malta. Consequently, the chapel and the surrounding military area was let abandoned. It was still used from time to time in the 1980s to host some meetings of the Assoċjazzjoni Sportiva Tigne, cultural events and rock concerts by Rokarja AST, as well as various theatrical productions. In the early 1990s it also served as a venue for tai chi training and ballroom dancing. Chapel restoration commenced in 2003.

Interior
The interior of the church included a chancel, two aisles, nave, an organ and a vestry. There was one stone altar surrounded with Corinthian capitalised style pillars forming three panels. The altar rail was decorated with Maltese crosses with the chancel floor finished off with red tiles and white marble steps. During restoration works the original floor finishing was retained.

References

Churches completed in 1910
20th-century Anglican church buildings
Sliema
Anglican church buildings in Malta
Former churches in Malta
20th-century Church of England church buildings
20th-century churches in Malta